The acronym LUSC might refer to:
 Leeds United Service Crew, an English football hooliganism firm
 Squamous-cell carcinoma of the lung, a type of cancer